Shalewa Ashafa (born 12 July 1995) popularly known as ShallyStar is a Nollywood actress who is known for her roles in Ajoche and The Razz Guy.

Early life and education 
Shalewa Ashafa was born as the last child of her parent in Ogun State on 12 July 1995. She obtained her primary school Certificate from Christ the Cornerstone Nursery and Primary School, GRA Ikeja, Lagos and completed her Secondary school at Iloko Model College in Osun state. She obtained her first degree in Advertising from the University of Lagos.

Acting career 
She started acting at a very early age as a member of drama club in church and school. Over the years, she has featured in different movies including the recent ones, The Razz Guy (2021) and  Blood Covenant (2022).

Filmography 
Evol (2017),

There is Something,

The Razz Guy,

Blood Covenant.

External links

References 

1995 births
Living people
Nigerian film actresses
University of Lagos alumni
21st-century Nigerian actresses
Yoruba actresses